The Mongol Derby is an equestrian endurance race.  The race extends 1,000 km (621 mi) through the Mongolian Steppe and is known as the world's longest horse race.  The course recreates the horse messenger system developed by Genghis Khan in 1224. In the 2016 race, there were 21 men and 23 women playing the role of the messengers, and representing 13 countries. The exact course changes every year, and is kept secret until shortly before the race begins. The terrain will invariably include mountain passes, green open valleys, wooded hills, river crossings, wetland and floodplains, sandy semi-arid dunes, rolling hills, dry riverbeds and of course open steppe. The entry fee (£11,375 in 2020) provides the rider with access to 25-27 Mongolian horses, a support team, pre-race training, and support stations along the way. Riders must change horses every 40 km (24.9 mi) at the support stations.  Along the way are vet checks to monitor the condition of the horses, and the vets may impose time penalties if the riders push their horses too hard along the trail.  To gain entry as a competitor, each rider must demonstrate that their riding skills are strong enough to endure the harsh terrain of the race.  The horses themselves are semi-wild, and may not cooperate with the rider, adding one more level of difficulty to the race. Riders will spend thirteen to fourteen hours a day in the saddle, and the race lasts ten days. To complete the race is an accomplishment in and of itself, as only half the racers usually finish the race in any given year.

History
The first Mongol Derby took place in 2009 and has continued annually since then.  It is a multi-horse race, modelled after the postal route established by Genghis Khan in 1224.  It was the world's first long distance postal system, based on a network of horse stations.  The Mongol Derby similarly incorporates 25 horse stations and rest stops along a length of 1,000 km (621 miles) through the Mongolian steppe.  Along the course of the race, riders have the option to stay with local nomads or camp out.  In 2010, the Mongol Derby achieved the Guinness World Record title of longest multi-horse race.

In addition to enduring the distance of the trek, some challenges faced by the participants include a high probability of injury associated with riding 25 different unfamiliar and "semi-wild" Mongol horses, travelling through remote and unmarked territory in a variety of landscapes, exposure to harsh elements, physical discomfort and exhaustion, and rules of the race, such as restricted riding hours allowed each day.

In 2016 the Mongol Derby was won in a tie by three people, William Comiskey aka Dingo of Australia, Heidi Telstad of Canada and Marcia Hefker Miles of the United States.

Past winners
The following is a list of past winners of the Mongol Derby, and their home countries.
 2019: Bob Long (United States of America)
 2018: Annabel Neasham (United Kingdom) and Adrian Corboy (Australia)
2017: Ed Fernon (Australia) and Barry Armitage (South Africa)
 2016: William Comiskey aka Dingo (Australia), Heidi Telstad (Canada) and Marcia Hefker Miles (United States of America)
 2015: Byeronie Epstein (South Africa)
 2014: Sam Jones (Australia)
 2013: Lara Prior-Palmer (United Kingdom)
 2012: Donal Fahy (Ireland) 
 2011: Craig Egberink (South Africa) 
 2010: Justin Nelzen (United States of America) 
 2009: Shiravsamboo Galbadrakh (Mongolia) and Charles van Wyk (South Africa)

Film
A feature documentary film, All the Wild Horses, was shot over three races between 2012 and 2016, and released in 2018. The producer, Ivo Marloh rode and completed the Mongol Derby twice himself in order to get the footage needed for the film. The movie won numerous international movie awards, including Best International Feature Documentary at the Galway Film Fleadh in Ireland.

References

External links

Endurance and trail riding
Endurance games
Horse races
Sports competitions in Mongolia